Jari Rantanen (born 31 December 1961 in Helsinki, Finland) is a retired football striker.

During his club career, Rantanen notably played for HJK Helsinki and FinnPa, as well as spells abroad with Estoril Praia, K. Beerschot V.A.C., IFK Göteborg and Leicester City. He also made 29 appearances for the Finland national team, scoring 4 goals.

Career statistics

International goals

References

External links
 

1961 births
Living people
Footballers from Helsinki
Finnish footballers
Finland international footballers
Finnish expatriate footballers
Association football forwards
Veikkausliiga players
Belgian Pro League players
Allsvenskan players
Helsingin Jalkapalloklubi players
Leicester City F.C. players
IFK Göteborg players
K. Beerschot V.A.C. players
FinnPa players
PK-35 Vantaa (men) players
UEFA Cup winning players
Expatriate footballers in Belgium
Expatriate footballers in England
Expatriate footballers in Sweden